Wilson Faumuina (June 11, 1954 – September 26, 1986) was an American football defensive lineman who played five seasons in the National Football League (NFL) for the Atlanta Falcons. He died at age 32 of heart failure. Wilson attended Balboa High School in San Francisco and played both defensive end and offensive tackle. He was All City several times. Wilson then attended San Jose State from which he was drafted by the Falcons as a first round draft pick, 20th overall in 1977 NFL Draft. He played five seasons with the Falcons from 1977 to 1981.

References 

1954 births
1986 deaths
American football defensive linemen
San Jose State Spartans football players
Atlanta Falcons players
Players of American football from American Samoa
American sportspeople of Samoan descent
Players of American football from San Francisco